Simon Okker (1 June 1881 – 6 March 1944) was a Dutch Olympic epee and foil fencer, who was killed in the Auschwitz concentration camp.

Biography
Okker was Jewish, and was born in Amsterdam, Netherlands. He participated in the 1906 Intercalated Games in Athens, Greece, coming in 5th, and in the 1908 Summer Olympics in London, England.

Okker was killed by the Nazis in the Auschwitz concentration camp in 1944.

His grandson Tom Okker became a successful tennis player.

References

1881 births
1944 deaths
Dutch male épée fencers
Dutch people who died in Auschwitz concentration camp
Jewish Dutch sportspeople
Jewish male épée fencers
Fencers at the 1906 Intercalated Games
Fencers at the 1908 Summer Olympics
Olympic fencers of the Netherlands
Dutch Jews who died in the Holocaust
Fencers from Amsterdam
Dutch civilians killed in World War II
Dutch male foil fencers
Jewish male foil fencers